Fakhar-e-Alam (Punjabi, ; born 19 January 1976) is a Pakistani actor, TV host, video jockey, and singer, famous for introducing the bhangra-rap fusion genre of music in Pakistan. Though he is still considered a pioneer of bhangra-rap music culture in Pakistan, he is now more popular for hosting TV shows, sports broadcasts, and high-profile national and international productions. He also served as the chairman of the Sindh Board of Film Censors from 2013 to 2016.

In 2018, he became the first and, to date, the only Pakistani in world history to circumnavigate the globe in a solo flight, in what he called Mission Parwaaz. He was aiming for a 28-day schedule and was planning on flying to 30 airports around the world.

In 2022, after doing an online course from the Harvard Business School, he earned an Alternative Investments certificate at the age of 46.

Early life
He was born on 19 January 1976 in Lahore and spent his early childhood in Lahore before moving to Islamabad. Due to his father's work in the Foreign Service of Pakistan, he travelled widely. He started schooling in Islamabad before going to school in the United States. After a few years of education and exposure in the United States, he returned to Islamabad to finish his schooling. He also attended Government College University, Lahore. Afterward, he moved to Karachi, and since 2004, he has been living in Dubai, United Arab Emirates (UAE), as an overseas Pakistani.

Career
Fakhar-e-Alam started his career as Pakistan's first rap artist with the music album RAP UP in 1996. The same year, he debuted as a presenter in Pakistan's first pop chart television show, Music Channel Charts. After the success of Music Channel Charts, he was offered the position of a presenter for Pepsi Top of the Pops. 

He met great success with his single "Bhangra Pao", a fusion of bhangra and rap music, in 1995. He received a gold disc for his debut album and is considered one of EMI Records' most successful artists. The single was also broadcast on MTV.

When he arrived in Karachi in 2004, Fakhar-e-Alam was offered a CEO position in an electronic media marketing company. He accepted the offer and stayed with the company for three months. He then launched his own production house called Industree Productions.

For GEO Television, Fakhr-e-Alam hosted the show Bolain Kya Baat Hai (Tell Us What is the Matter?) telecast on Geo Super, where he interviewed various sports personalities and discussed cricket and other sports-related events.
 
Fakhr-e-Alam started an entertainment show, The Big Show, on CNBC PAKISTAN on 17 December 2011.

Fakhr-e-Alam's show Aaghaz-e-Safar, based on real-life stories of Pakistanis, aired on 18 April 2014. The show was produced and directed by Sharmeen Obaid-Chinoy, a two-time Pakistani Oscar winner. It was the first time Obaid-Chinoy produced for a Pakistani TV channel. The show aired on AAJ TV in Pakistan.

In 2016, after the murder of a popular qawwal, Amjad Sabri, in Karachi, Fakhr-e-Alam led a movement pressing for better government security for artists.

On 1 August 2017, he became the second Pakistani celebrity invited to speak at Googleplex. The next day, he visited the Facebook headquarters, making him the first Pakistani celebrity to do so. 

In May 2021, he was announced as the host of 60 Hours to Glory, a military reality show featuring several international teams. It was broadcast on Hum TV, Hum News, and PTV Home. On 27 June 2021, he was bestowed with the UAE golden visa, making him the first Pakistani celebrity to receive it.

On 2 October 2021, Fakhr-e-Alam announced a partnership with Dubai-based esports organisation Galaxy Racer. As a result of the deal, the two parties will collaborate to create Galaxy Racer Pakistan. Later that month, he hosted the sports show The Pavilion on A Sports as part of its coverage of the 2021 ICC Men's T20 World Cup.

2005 earthquake relief work
Fakhar-e-Alam was actively involved in humanitarian activities and relief work after the 2005 Kashmir earthquake.

Awards 
 National Film Award for Best Actor in Very Good Dunya Very Bad Loag (1998)
 Sitar-e-Eesaar (Presidential Medal of Sacrifice and Honour) in 2006
 Sitara-e-Imtiaz for hosting in 2022

Discography

Albums
 Malang (1997)
 Falam Connection (2001)
 Falam Ab Tak (2004)
 B3 (2012)

Filmography 
 Very Good Dunya Very Bad Loag (1998)
 No Paisa No Problem (2000)
 Sarhad Paar (2006)

References

External links
 

1976 births
Living people
Hip hop singers
Pakistani pop singers
Pakistani rappers
Pakistani television hosts
Singers from Lahore
Male actors from Lahore
Pakistani expatriates in the United States
Pakistani aviation record holders
Harvard Business School alumni